Andrea Pietra is an Argentine actress. She worked with Nancy Dupláa as the lead actresses of Socias. She suggested her to hire the actress Paola Barrientos for her new telenovela, Graduados. In 2012 she joined the telenovela Sos mi hombre.

Works

Film

Television

References

Actresses from Buenos Aires
1968 births
Living people